Metanarsia kosakewitshi is a moth of the family Gelechiidae. It is found in south-eastern Kazakhstan.

The length of the forewings is about 11 mm. Adults are on wing in June.

References

Moths described in 1990
Metanarsia